Sochor (Czech feminine: Sochorová) is the surname of the following people:

 Cornelia Sochor (born 1994), Austrian footballer
 Jan Sochor (born 1980), Czech ice hockey player
 Jim Sochor (1938–2015), American football player, coach, and college athletics administrator
 Miloslav Sochor (born 1952), Czechoslovak Olympic alpine skier
 Petra Sochorová (born 1978), Czech chess player

See also
 

Czech-language surnames